Te Whanga Lagoon dominates the geography of Chatham Island, in the South Pacific Ocean off New Zealand's east coast.

It is the outflow of several small rivers in the island's hilly south, and drains to the Pacific via gaps in Hanson Bay on the east coast of the island.

It contains many fossilized shark teeth that can be collected from the edges of the lagoon. Over time the lagoon is likely to silt up.

Gallery

References

Landforms of the Chatham Islands
Lagoons of New Zealand
Chatham Island